Tethea ocularis, the figure of eighty, is a moth of the family Drepanidae. The species was first described by Carl Linnaeus in his 1767 12th edition of Systema Naturae. It is found throughout Continental Europe and has a scattered distribution in England and Wales, although it is absent from Scotland and Ireland.

The wingspan is 35–45 mm; the dark brown forewings being marked with dark-centred white stigmata which do look rather like the number 80. The hindwings are grey. The species flies from May to July and is attracted to light and sugar.

The grey and white larva feeds on poplar and aspen. The species overwinters as a pupa.

Subspecies
Tethea ocularis ocularis
Tethea ocularis ocularis amurensis (Warren, 1912) (Russian Far East, north-eastern and northern China, Mongolia, Korea)
Tethea ocularis opa Zolotuhin, 1997 (Uzbekistan, China: Xinjiang)
Tethea ocularis osthelderi (Bytinski-Salz & Brandt, 1937) (Iran)
Tethea ocularis tanakai Inoue, 1982 (Japan)

  The flight season refers to the British Isles. This may vary in other parts of the range.

References 
Chinery, Michael (1986, reprinted 1991). Collins Guide to the Insects of Britain and Western Europe.
Skinner, Bernard (1984). The Colour Identification Guide to Moths of the British Isles.

External links

Lepiforum e.V.

Thyatirinae
Moths described in 1767
Drepanid moths of Great Britain
Moths of Japan
Moths of Europe
Moths of Asia
Taxa named by Carl Linnaeus